ISO 3166-2:PL is the entry for Poland in ISO 3166-2, part of the ISO 3166 standard published by the International Organization for Standardization (ISO), which defines codes for the names of the principal subdivisions (e.g., provinces or states) of all countries coded in ISO 3166-1.

Currently for Poland, ISO 3166-2 codes are defined for 16 voivodeships.

Each code consists of two parts, separated by a hyphen. The second part is two digits.

Current codes
Subdivision names are listed as in the ISO 3166-2 standard published by the ISO 3166 Maintenance Agency (ISO 3166/MA).

Subdivision names are sorted in Polish alphabetical order: a, ą, b-c, ć, d-e, ę, f-l, ł, m-n, ń, o, ó, p-s, ś, t-z, ź, ż.

Click on the button in the header to sort each column.

 Notes

Changes
The following changes to the entry have been announced by the ISO 3166/MA since the first publication of ISO  in 1998. ISO stopped issuing newsletters in 2013.

Codes before Newsletter I-1

Codes before 2018-11-26 update

See also
 Subdivisions of Poland
 FIPS region codes of Poland
 NUTS codes of Poland

External links
 ISO Online Browsing Platform: PL
 Voivodships of Poland, Statoids.com

2:PL
ISO 3166-2
Poland geography-related lists